Eric Hjorleifson (born 14 March 1983) is a professional freeskier. He was born and raised in Canmore, Alberta. Hjorleifson contributes yearly to ski movies made by the film company Matchstick Productions. Eric creates the design and graphics for a line of skis for 4FRNT.

Childhood
Hjorleifson grew up in Canmore, Alberta. His father was a gymnastics coach and a stonemason. He learned to ski before he was two years old. His biggest mentor was his father, but also local race coaches Richard Jagger and Guy Mowbray.

Sponsors
 4FRNT Skis
 Smith Optics
 Arc'teryx
 Dynafit
 Gordini
 Discrete Headwear
 Fresh Sports
 Surefoot (footbeds)
 Dissent Labs (compression socks)
 Exped

Filmography
 Superheroes of Stoke - 2012
 Attack of La Niña - 2011
 All I Can - 2011
 The Way I See It - 2010
 In Deep - 2009
 Claim - 2008
 Seven Sunny Days - 2007
 Push - 2006
 Pull - 2006 
 The Hit List - 2005
 Yearbook - 2004

Industry awards
 2013 Powder Video Awards - "Best Line"

References

Canadian male freestyle skiers
1983 births
Living people
Sportspeople from Alberta